In enzymology, a nicotinate-nucleotide adenylyltransferase is an enzyme that catalyzes the chemical reaction

ATP + nicotinate ribonucleotide  diphosphate + deamido-NAD+

Thus, the two substrates of this enzyme are ATP and nicotinate ribonucleotide, whereas its two products are diphosphate and deamido-NAD+.

This enzyme belongs to the family of transferases, specifically those transferring phosphorus-containing nucleotide groups (nucleotidyltransferases).  The systematic name of this enzyme class is ATP:nicotinate-ribonucleotide adenylyltransferase. Other names in common use include deamido-NAD+ pyrophosphorylase, nicotinate mononucleotide adenylyltransferase, deamidonicotinamide adenine dinucleotide pyrophosphorylase, NaMN-ATase, and nicotinic acid mononucleotide adenylyltransferase.  This enzyme participates in nicotinate and nicotinamide metabolism.

Structural studies

References 

 

EC 2.7.7
Enzymes of known structure